The 110th Virginia General Assembly was the meeting of the legislative branch of the Virginia state government from 1918 to 1920, after the 1917 state elections. It convened in Richmond for two sessions.

Background

Party summary
Resignations and new members are discussed in the "Changes in membership" section, below.

Senate

Senate

Leadership

Members

House of Delegates

Leadership

Changes in membership

Senate
December 21, 1918, Sands Gayle (D-18th district) dies. Replaced by Samuel L. Ferguson at start of extra session.
January 28, 1919, Henry H. Downing (D-12th district) dies. Replaced by Robert F. Leedy at start of extra session.
March 25, 1919, James T. Lacy (D-21st district) resigns to accept appointment as Halifax County clerk. Replaced by Marshall B. Booker at start of extra session.

See also
 List of Virginia state legislatures

References

Government of Virginia
Virginia legislative sessions
1918 in Virginia
1919 in Virginia
1918 U.S. legislative sessions
1919 U.S. legislative sessions